Live in Europe is a live album by American guitarist Leo Kottke, released in 1980. The title "Palms Blvd." is only available as a live performance.

Live in Europe was re-released on CD by BGO in  1996.

Reception

Writing for Allmusic, music critic Murrday Fisher wrote of the album "... exemplary folk guitar... Fans who enjoy Kottke's earlier albums, like Ice Water and Chewing Pine, will also appreciate this follow-up."

Track listing
All songs by Leo Kottke except as noted.

Side one
 "The Train and the Gate" – 2:48
 "Open Country Joy: Theme and Adhesions" – 7:06
 "Airproofing" – 4:30
 "Tell Mary" – 3:14

Side two
 "Wheels" (Norman Petty) – 2:19
 "Up Tempo" – 1:58
 "Palms Blvd." – 2:45
 "Shadowland" – 4:09
 "Eggtooth" – 5:34
Two bonus tracks were included in the CD release:
 "Pamela Brown" (Tom T. Hall) – 4:14
 "Range" – 3:50

Personnel
Leo Kottke - acoustic guitar, vocals
Production notes:
Produced by Leo Kottke
Engineered by Robert Collins and Jeff Hooper
Mastered by George Peckham

References

External links
 Leo Kottke's official site
 Unofficial Leo Kottke web site (fan site)

Leo Kottke live albums
1980 live albums
Chrysalis Records live albums